The Central Arid Zone Research Institute (CAZRI) is one of the biggest research institutes of the Indian Council of Agricultural Research (ICAR), an autonomous organization working under the aegis of the Department of Agriculture Research and Education (DARE) of the Ministry of Agriculture and Farmers Welfare of Government of India. CAZRI has the distinction of being one of the first institutes in the world exclusively devoted to arid zone research and development. The institute made a humble beginning in 1952 when Government of India initiated Desert Afforestation Research Station at Jodhpur to carry out research on sand dune stabilization and for establishment of shelter belt plantations to arrest wind erosion.
It was reorganized as Desert Afforestation and Soil Conservation Station in 1957 and finally in its present form Central Arid Zone Research Institute in 1959 on recommendation of the UNESCO (United Nations Educational, Scientific and Cultural Organization) expert, Prof. C.S. Christian of the Commonwealth Scientific and Industrial Research Organisation (CSIRO), Australia. In 1966, the institute was brought under the administrative control of Indian Council of Agricultural Research (ICAR), New Delhi.

The institute conducts multi-disciplinary research to seek solutions to the problems of farming in arid regions of the country. The hot arid zone covers about 32 million ha area in the states of Rajasthan, Gujarat, Punjab, Haryana, Karnataka and Andhra Pradesh, while the cold arid zone, covering about 7 million ha area, is located in the states of Jammu and Kashmir and Himachal Pradesh.

The Institute earned the prestigious Sardar Patel Outstanding ICAR Institution Award for the Year - 2017 for the Large Institute Category.  Dr. Trilochan Mohapatra, Secretary (DARE) & DG (ICAR) conferred the Award including Plaque, Citation and Certificate during an event organized at the ICAR-Indian Agricultural Research Institute (IARI), Pusa, New Delhi.

Mandate 

 Basic and applied research on sustainable farming systems in arid ecosystem  
 Repository of information on the state of natural resources and desertification processes 
 Livestock-based farming systems and range management practices for the chronically drought affected areas  
 Generation and transfer of location-specific technologies Infrastructure

The institute at its headquarter is carrying out systematic research on understanding and managing hot arid region's natural resources, sustainable farming systems, improvement of plant resources especially the crops, livestock production and management and use of alternate energy resources through six divisions:

Divisions 

 Division of Natural Resources
 Division of Integrated Farming Systems
 Division of Plant Improvement and Pest Management
 Division of Livestock Production and Range Management
 Division of Agricultural Engineering and Renewable Energy
 Division of Transfer of Technology and Training

CAZRI has five Regional Research Stations (RRSs) to address the region specific problems within arid zone. The institute also hosts an All India National Network Project on Vertebrate Pest Management with its centres spread in many institutes and SAUs located in different agro ecological regions of the country.

Regional Research Stations 

 RRS Pali-Marwar (Rajasthan)
 RRS Jaisalmer (Rajasthan)
 RRS Bikaner (Rajasthan) 
 RRS Kukma-Bhuj (Gujarat)
 RRS Leh (Ladakh)

Several need-based, cost effective technologies like sand dune stabilization, wind erosion control, water management, grassland improvement, watershed development, rehabilitation of wastelands, arid land farming systems, arid horticulture, alternate land use strategies, pest management, solar devices, etc. have been developed and transferred to farmers and other stakeholders.

This institute has the rare distinction in having a full-fledged section on renewable energy and has developed many solar energy based gadgets/devices, like animal feed cooker, dryers, water heaters, candle making device, cool chambers, etc., which are finding place in rural households. Agro-voltaic system of 105 kW capacity has been developed at Jodhpur integrating crop production, PV-based electricity generation and rainwater harvesting. The institute has evolved technologies and strategies for combating drought and desertification.  

 
It has developed close liaison with several national and international organizations and has made major strides in providing advisories and consultancies to many agencies in India and abroad. Besides, CAZRI is a major destination for capacity building of scientists, policy planners and extension officials related to arid zone development.

Through its extension wing and Krishi Vigyan Kendras (located at Jodhpur, Pali and Kukma-Bhuj) the institute is in direct touch with farmers, state government officials, NGOs and other stakeholders and organises regular trainings and demonstrations.

Facilities 
The headquarter and regional research stations (RRSs) of the institute are well equipped with laboratories, research farms, field laboratories and office facilities. One auditorium, two conference rooms, a museum, one international guest house, one training hostel and one farmers' hostel are the other facilities available at the headquarter. Krishi Vigyan Kendras (Jodhpur and Pali), have training and residential facilities for farmers, lend additional support for the transfer of technologies and outreach programs of the institute. The institute has a wide collection of books and journals in its library named after Dr. P.C. Raheja. The library uses bar coding of books. The Environment Information System (ENVIS) centre  on desertification is also part of institute. All the Regional Research Stations are linked with Consortium for e-resources in Agriculture (CeRA) by static ID.

See also
Indian Council of Agricultural Research
Arid Forest Research Institute Jodhpur
 Central Sheep and Wool Research Institute Avikanagar
 Indian Council of Forestry Research and Education
 Van Vigyan Kendra (VVK) Forest Science Centres

External links
 Central Arid Zone Research Institute official website

Research institutes in Rajasthan
Organisations based in Jodhpur
Thar Desert
Research institutes established in 1959
1959 establishments in Rajasthan